Nelson Franklin is an American actor best known for his television roles in The Millers, Traffic Light, The Office, New Girl, Black-ish, and Veep.

Life and career
Franklin was born to father Howard Franklin, a screenwriter and director. His stepmother is DJ Anne Litt. Franklin attended high school at Campbell Hall School in Studio City, California. He graduated from New York University Tisch School of the Arts.

Franklin's first major role was a recurring role as Nick, the I.T. worker on NBC's The Office. Franklin later went on to appear as a series regular on the short-lived FOX comedy series Traffic Light. He appeared with another Office actor, David Denman, who played Pam's ex-fiancée Roy. His side projects include a short for Funny or Die: a fake commercial promoting the Dudes-N-Bros Talking Points System, which is a service that helps guys who aren't dudes or bros hold a conversation with dudes and bros. He co-starred on the CBS sitcom The Millers and has appeared on the FOX sitcom New Girl, the HBO political comedy Veep, Black-ish, and Abby's. Franklin currently streams video games on the platform Twitch under the name “Slaughterpop”.

Filmography

Film

Television

Awards and nominations

References

External links

American male film actors
American male television actors
Living people
Tisch School of the Arts alumni
Place of birth missing (living people)
21st-century American male actors
Year of birth missing (living people)